"Mice Love Rice" is a 2004 Chinese pop song written by a then unknown music teacher Yang Chengang which gained popularity across Asia via the Internet after being posted online. The original free online version was sung by Yang's friend Wang Qiwen.

Music and lyrics
One of the song's attractions is a catchy music hook around the lyric "I love you, loving you / As mice love rice".

"Mice Love Rice," was one of the first notable download hits in China, at the same period as "Lilac Flower" by Tang Lei and "The Pig" by Xiangxiang. "Mice Love Rice" became a hit in mainland China, Taiwan, Hong Kong, Indonesia, Malaysia, Singapore and Vietnam.

Chinese cover versions 
In Hong Kong, the Emperor Entertainment Group  bought the license for redistributing in the local market and the lyrics of the Mandarin song were rewritten into a Cantonese version, except for the famous motif of the song which remains in Mandarin. The song was sung in Cantonese by Twins, a Hong Kong-based two-girl band.  In Singapore, recording company  Play Music won the rights to marketing the song in Singapore, and they released a single of the track as sung by Jocie Kok. Yang's song has been sung by many other Chinese artists, and Xiang Xiang, another mainland Chinese singer who issued an English translation afterwards, of dubious grammatical accuracy.

There is also an unofficial "sequel" to the song, "The Mice No Longer Love Rice" written by Chen Yipeng.

Foreign versions 
"Mice Love Rice" has also inspired other songs throughout the world including Sarang Haeyo ("I Love You") by Korean singer Lee So-Eun, Nezumi wa Kome ga Suki ("Mice Love Rice") by Japanese artist Karen Miyama, two Khmer versions by Cambodian singers Chhet Sovan Panha and Preap Sovath, "Cos I Love You" by the Australian boy band North, and Chuột yêu gạo by Vietnamese singer Thanh Thảo.

References

External links 
 The Million Dollar Mouse

Chinese songs
Chinglish
Mandarin-language songs
2004 songs